Herr Edmund Parish (1861–1916) was a German psychologist and hallucination researcher.

Parish is known for producing a dissociation model of hallucinations. Parish was skeptical of parapsychology. He disputed the claims of telepathy made by the members of the Society for Psychical Research. His book Hallucinations and Illusions: A Study of the Fallacies of Perception discusses the fallacies of memory and perception and explores waking hallucinations of healthy persons. It was republished in 2011 by the Cambridge Library Collection.

Publications
Hallucinations and Illusions: A Study of the Fallacies of Perception (1897)

References

1861 births
1916 deaths
Critics of parapsychology
German psychologists
German skeptics